Seyfi is both a Turkish surname and a given name. Notable people with the name include:

Given name
Seyfi Arkan (1903–1966), Turkish architect
Seyfi Dursunoğlu (1932–2020), Turkish showman
Seyfi Düzgören (1880–1948), Turkish Army general
Seyfi Havaeri (1920–2009), Turkish actor, screenwriter and film director

Surname
Ali Rıza Seyfi (1879–1958), Turkish writer, historian and poet
Tim Seyfi (born 1971), Turkish-German actor

Ship
Seyfi (sunk on 25-26 May 1877), Turkish river monitor.

Turkish-language surnames